The following lists events that happened during 2016 in New Zealand.

Population
National
Estimated populations as at 30 June.
 New Zealand total – 4,693,000
 North Island – 3,596,200
 South Island – 1,096,200

Main urban areas
Estimated populations as at 30 June.

Auckland – 1,495,000
Blenheim – 30,700
Christchurch – 389,700
Dunedin – 118,500
Gisborne – 36,100
Hamilton – 229,900
Invercargill – 50,700
Kapiti – 41,800
Napier-Hastings – 131,000
Nelson – 65,700
New Plymouth – 56,800
Palmerston North – 84,300
Rotorua – 57,800
Tauranga – 134,500
Wellington – 405,000
Whanganui – 39,600
Whangārei – 56,400

Incumbents

Regal and vice-regal
Head of State – Elizabeth II
Governor-General – Jerry Mateparae until 31 August, then Patsy Reddy from 28 September.

Government
2016 is the second full year of the 51st Parliament, which first sat on 21 October 2014.

The Fifth National Government, first elected in 2008, continues.

Speaker of the House – David Carter
Prime Minister – John Key (until 12 December), then Bill English
Deputy Prime Minister – Bill English (until 12 December), then Paula Bennett
 Leader of the House – Gerry Brownlee
Minister of Finance – Bill English, then (from 20 December) Steven Joyce
Minister of Foreign Affairs – Murray McCully

Other party leaders
Labour – Andrew Little
Green  – James Shaw and Metiria Turei
New Zealand First – Winston Peters
Māori Party  – Te Ururoa Flavell and Marama Fox
ACT New Zealand – David Seymour
United Future – Peter Dunne

Judiciary
Chief Justice — Sian Elias

Main centre leaders
Mayor of Auckland – Len Brown, then from 1 November Phil Goff
Mayor of Tauranga – Stuart Crosby, then from 31 October Greg Brownless
Mayor of Hamilton – Julie Hardaker, then from 9 November Andrew King
Mayor of Wellington – Celia Wade-Brown, then from 26 October Justin Lester
Mayor of Christchurch – Lianne Dalziel
Mayor of Dunedin – Dave Cull

Events

January

February
 8 February – Operation Neptune (New Zealand) begins.
 14 February – Significant aftershock in Christchurch causing some cliffs to collapse.

March
 3–24 March – Second referendum on changing the country's flag – existing flag retained

April

May

June
 6 June – The 2016 Queen's Birthday Honours are announced

July

August
 5–21 August – 132 athletes from New Zealand will compete in the 2016 Summer Olympics in Rio de Janeiro, Brazil

September

October
 8 October – New Zealand local elections

November
 14 November – A 7.5–7.8 MW earthquake strikes Kaikoura district as significant aftershock in Christchurch, which killed at least two people.
 22 November – Operation Neptune (New Zealand) ends.

December
 5 December – John Key announces that he will step down as New Zealand Prime Minister and leader of the National Party on 12 December
 12 December – Bill English is sworn in as New Zealand's 39th Prime Minister, following the resignation of John Key
 31 December – The 2017 New Year Honours are announced

Arts and literature

Performing arts

Benny Award presented by the Variety Artists Club of New Zealand to Suzanne Prentice OBE.

Sport

Awards
 54th Halberg Awards (awarded 9 February 2017 for the 2016 calendar year)
 Supreme Award – Lisa Carrington (canoeing)
 Sportsman – Mahé Drysdale (rowing)
 Sportswoman – Lisa Carrington (canoeing)
 Team – Men's 49er class: Peter Burling & Blair Tuke (sailing)
 Disabled Sportsperson – Liam Malone (athletics)
 Coach – Gordon Walker (canoeing)
 Emerging Talent – Campbell Stewart (cycling)

Olympics

 New Zealand sends a team of 199 competitors across 20 sports.
 Sprint canoeist Lisa Carrington becomes the first New Zealand women to win two medals in the same Olympic Games.

Paralympics

Swimmer Sophie Pascoe overtook Eve Rimmer to become New Zealand's most successful Paralympian in terms of medals won.

Athletics
Summer Olympics
 Valerie Adams won the silver medal in the women's shot put (20.42 m)
 Eliza McCartney won the bronze medal in the women's pole vault (4.80 m)
 Tom Walsh won the bronze medal in the men's shot put (21.36 m)
 Nick Willis won the bronze medal in the men's 1500 metres (3:50.24)
Summer Paralympics
 Liam Malone won gold medals in the men's 200 metres T44 and men's 400 metres T44, and the silver medal in the men's 100 metres T44
 Anna Grimaldi won the gold medal in the women's long jump T47
 Holly Robinson won the silver medal in the women's javelin throw F46
 William Stedman won bronze medals in the men's 400 metres T36 and the men's 800 metres T36.
 Jess Hamill won the bronze medal in the women's shot put F34
 Rory McSweeney won the bronze medal in the men's javelin throw F44

Rowing
Summer Olympics
 Hamish Bond and Eric Murray won the gold medal in the men's coxless pair
 Mahé Drysdale won the gold medal in the men's single sculls
 Genevieve Behrent and Rebecca Scown won the silver medal in the women's coxless pair
New Zealand Secondary School Championships (Maadi Cup)
 Maadi Cup (boys U18 coxed eight) – Christ's College
 Levin 75th Jubilee Cup (girls U18 coxed eight) – Diocesan School for Girls
 Star Trophy (overall points) – St Peter's School (Cambridge)

Shooting
Ballinger Belt – Malcolm Dodson (Kaituna/Blenheim)
Summer Olympics – Natalie Rooney won the silver medal in the women's trap shooting

Youth Olympics

 New Zealand sends a team of 11 competitors in five sports.

Births
 6 November – Probabeel, Thoroughbred racehorse

Deaths

January
 2 January – Tim Francis, diplomat (born 1928)
 5 January – Keith Thiele, World War II pilot (born 1921)
 7 January – David Shale, mathematician (born 1932)
 8 January – Ida Gaskin, schoolteacher, quiz show contestant, politician (born 1919)
 17 January
 Melvin Day, artist (born 1923)
 Jules Le Lievre, rugby union player (born 1933)
 22 January – Alec Wishart, musician (born 1939)
 23 January – Barry Brickell, potter (born 1935)
 24 January – Neville Black, rugby union and rugby league player (born 1925)
 26 January – Bob Thomas, long jumper (born 1939)
 27 January – Shirley Tonkin, sudden infant death syndrome researcher (born 1921)
 28 January
 Rob Courtney, Paralympic athlete (born 1959)
 Peter Robinson, musician (born 1958)
 Bob Tizard, politician, deputy prime minister (1974–75) (born 1924)
 31 January
 Mere Broughton, Māori language activist, unionist (born 1938)
 Rona McCarthy, athlete (born 1916)

February
 1 February – Kelly McGarry, mountain biker (born 1982)
 2 February
 Chris Kenny, boxing trainer (born 1937)
 Marcus Turner, singer-songwriter, folk musician, television presenter (born 1956)
 7 February – Andrew Hintz, cricketer (born 1963)
 10 February – John Spencer, businessman (born 1934)
 13 February – Barry Jones, Catholic Bishop of Christchurch (born 1941)
 17 February – Sophia Hawthorne, actress (born 1976)
 23 February – George Newton, weightlifter (born 1936)
 24 February – Ken English, rugby league player (born 1927)
 26 February – Jack Forrest, rugby league player (born 1924)
 28 February – Bob Morrison, association footballer (born 1926)
 29 February – Ranginui Walker, Māori academic (born 1932)

March
 3 March – Martin Crowe, cricketer (born 1962)
 4 March – Harry Turbott, architect, landscape architect, environmentalist (born 1930)
 5 March – David Abbott, cricket umpire (born 1934)
 10 March – Judy Pickard, abstract painter, librarian and advocate for women's rights (born 1921)
 11 March – Sel Belsham, rugby league player, cricketer (born 1930)
 16 March – George Menzies, rugby league player and coach (born 1930)
 18 March – Paul Swadel, film director and producer (born 1969)
 19 March – Graham Fortune, diplomat and public servant (born 1941)
 25 March – Ross Jennings, television producer and director (born 1944)
 27 March – Frank Torley, television reporter, director and producer (born 1941)
 31 March – Mark Vryenhoek, alpine skier (born 1960)

April
 3 April 
 Rowley Habib, poet, playwright, short-story writer (born 1933)
 Whai Ngata, broadcaster, journalist, lexicographer (born 1942)
 4 April – Maida Bryant, politician, community leader (born 1926)
 7 April – Matiu Dickson, politician, kapa haka exponent (born 1952)
 11 April – Ruth Gilbert, poet (born 1917)
 12 April – Alan Loveday, violinist (born 1928)
 13 April – Kurtis Haiu, rugby union player (born 1984)
 14 April – Colin Knight, educationalist (born 1934)
 22 April
 Rex Fell, Thoroughbred racehorse breeder (born 1945)
 Peter Sellers, sports broadcaster (born 1921)
 23 April – Bill Sevesi, musician (born 1923)
 24 April – Paul Annear, jeweller (born 1947)
 27 April – Chris Parkinson, broadcaster (born 1941)

May
 3 May – Ian Quigley, politician (born 1931)
 13 May – David Garner, physical oceanographer (born 1928)
 18 May – Ian Watkin, actor (born 1940)
 21 May – Tony Kriletich, rugby league player (born 1944)
 25 May – Bob Sorenson, rugby union player and coach, cricketer (born 1923)

June
 1 June – Leonard Boyle, bishop (born 1930)
 2 June
 Keith Lawrence, World War II fighter pilot (born 1919)
 Brian Reidy, rugby league player (born 1939)
 4 June – Bill Snowden, rugby league player (born 1935)
 6 June – Keith Smith, cricketer (born 1929)
 7 June – Sir Graham Latimer, Māori leader (born 1926)
 9 June – Joyce Carpenter, diver (born 1923)
 10 June – Derek Wilson, architect and environmentalist (born 1922)
 15 June – David Hall, chemistry academic (born 1928)
 16 June – Pat Suggate, geologist (born 1922)
 21 June – Susanna Ounei, Kanak independence activist, feminist (born 1945)
 23 June – Roy Crawford, mechanical engineering academic, university administrator (born 1949)
 25 June – Jack Cropp, yachtsman (born 1927)
 27 June – Dame Grace Hollander, community leader (born 1922)
 29 June – Maurie Gordon, sport shooter (born 1926)

July
 5 July
 Johnny Borland, high jumper, athletics administrator (born 1925)
 Max Carr, field athlete and coach, athletics official, air force officer (born 1922)
 Rex Pickering, rugby union player (born 1936)
 14 July
 Ivan Bootham, writer, composer (born 1939)
 Hallard "Snow" White, rugby union player, coach and administrator (born 1929)
 19 July – Ray Bell, rugby union player (born 1925)
 20 July
 Dick Corballis, English literature academic (born 1946)
 Ray Moreton, rugby union player (born 1942)
 21 July – Sid Hurst, farmer (born 1918)
 22 July – Lee Grant, actor, singer, choreographer (born 1931)
 25 July – Tony Lentino, motor racing team owner (born 1974)
 26 July – Henry Connor, botanist (born 1922)

August
 2 August – Terence Bayler, actor (born 1930)
 3 August – Chris Amon, motor racing driver (born 1943)
 5 August – Don Donnithorne, architect (born 1926)
 7 August – Sir Ron Scott, sports administrator (born 1928)
 11 August – Sir Ian Turbott, diplomat, university administrator (born 1922)
 19 August – Bob Skelton, jockey (born 1934)
 22 August – Don McIver, military leader, public servant (born 1936)
 24 August – Glen Evans, politician, mayor of Lower Hutt (1986–95) (born 1936)
 29 August – Edward Latter, military officer, politician, diplomat (born 1928)
 30 August – Brian Robinson, inorganic chemist (born 1940)

September
 1 September – Sir Graeme Douglas, businessman, pharmacist, philanthropist (born 1929)
 4 September – Ross McPherson, field hockey player, cricketer (born 1938)
 7 September – Don "D. J." Cameron, sports journalist (born 1933)
 11 September – Let's Elope, Thoroughbred racehorse (foaled 1987)
 16 September – Reese Griffiths, rugby league player (born 1937)
 19 September – Margaret Baird, immunologist (born 1945)
 23 September 
 Arnold Green, rugby league player (born 1933)
 Bill Johnson, actor (born 1924)

October
 1 October
 Brian Bell, ornithologist (born 1930)
 Toni Williams, singer (born 1939)
 3 October – David Donald, cricketer (born 1933)
 4 October – Peggy Hay, designer (born 1924)
 14 October
 Avis Higgs, textile designer, painter (born 1918)
 Helen Kelly, trade unionist (born 1964)
 15 October
 Doug Anderson, rugby league player (born 1926)
 Octagonal, Thoroughbred racehorse (foaled 1992)
 21 October – Wally Argus, rugby union player (born 1921)
 24 October – Roger Slack, plant biologist and biochemist (born 1937)
 29 October – Tom Weal, politician (born 1929)
 30 October – Reg Boorman, politician (born 1935)

November
 11 November – Sir James McNeish, writer (born 1931)
 13 November – Leslie Kenton, journalist, entrepreneur (born 1941)
 14 November – Marti Friedlander, photographer (born 1928)
 15 November – Rod Bieleski, plant physiologist (born 1931)
 16 November – Jean Wishart, magazine editor (born 1920)
 20 November
 Mita Mohi, rugby league player, mau rākau and kapa haka exponent, youth worker (born 1939)
 Tim Raphael, Anglican priest (born 1929)
 21 November – Helen Ryburn, school principal, local-body politician (born 1925)
 22 November
 Mike Burgoyne, rugby union player (born 1951)
 Bev Malcolm, netball player (born 1920)
 25 November – Bill Skelton, jockey (born 1931)
 28 November – Ray Columbus, entertainer (born 1942)
 29 November – Margaret Belcher, literary scholar (born 1936)

December
 3 December – Sir David Hay, cardiologist, anti-smoking campaigner (born 1927)
 6 December – Elva Bett, artist, art historian, art gallery director (born 1918)
 12 December – Lord Gyllene, Thoroughbred racehorse (foaled 1988)
 13 December – Christopher Vance, Standardbred racehorse (foaled 1986)
 14 December – Bunny Walters, singer (born 1953)
 15 December – Richard Dowden, astrophysicist (born 1932)
 18 December – Frank Crotty, rower, industrial chemist (born 1938)
 19 December – Arthur Berry, cricketer (born 1928)
 23 December – Doug Coombs, cricketer, geologist (born 1924)
 24 December – Ron Broom, cricketer (born 1925)
 25 December – John Gregson, George Cross recipient (born 1924)
 30 December – Con Linton, sailor (born 1938)

References

 
2010s in New Zealand
Years of the 21st century in New Zealand